Dolo is a town in the Dolo Department of Bougouriba Province in south-western Burkina Faso. The town has a population of 2,843 and is the capital of Dolo Department.

References

External links
Satellite map at Maplandia.com

Populated places in the Sud-Ouest Region (Burkina Faso)
Bougouriba Province